Ulrich Baumgartner may refer to several prominent Austrian and German historical figures, including:

People named Ulrich Baumgartner
 Ulrich Baumgartner (cultural manager), former artistic director of the Wiener Festwochen
 Ulrich Baumgartner (cabinet maker), 17th century joiner responsible for the Pomeranian Art Cabinet, and father of Melchior Baumgartner

Others with similar names
 Ulrike Baumgartner (born 1974), former cyclist